also known as  is a Japanese adventure and fantasy manga series written and illustrated by Nakaba Suzuki. It is a sequel to Suzuki's previous series, The Seven Deadly Sins. The manga has been serialized in Kodansha's Weekly Shōnen Magazine since January 2021, with its chapters collected into eleven tankōbon volumes as of March 2023. The manga is digitally published in North America as it is released in Japan, with Kodansha USA licensing the series for publication in English on Crunchyroll Manga, BookWalker, ComiXology and Amazon Kindle. An anime television series adaptation by Telecom Animation Film will premiere in 2023.

Premise 
Set years after the disbanding of the Seven Deadly Sins, Britannia's most infamous Holy Knights, the  series focuses on the young boy Percival, who discovers that he is destined to be part of a group of four knights prophesied to destroy the world. Targeted by the forces of Camelot as a result, Percival travels to find the other three members of the Four Knights alongside Lancelot, a Liones knight who is the son of the Seven Sins member Ban.

Production

Development 
Following the conclusion of The Seven Deadly Sins manga with the release of its 346th chapter, the final chapter of the series, in the 17th issue of Weekly Shōnen Magazine on March 25, 2020, it was announced by the manga's author, Nakaba Suzuki, that his next series would serve as a sequel to The Seven Deadly Sins. The manga artist also revealed that the new series was tentatively titled The Four Knights of the Apocalypse, which he later changed by removing the word The at the beginning, giving the manga its current title.

Characters 

While planning the storyline for the manga, Suzuki originally desired to use the character of Tristan—who was introduced at the end of The Seven Deadly Sins as the son of Meliodas and Elizabeth Liones—to be the protagonist of Four Knights of the Apocalypse. However, Suzuki eventually changed his mind, not wanting to have a main character so closely related to the cast of his previous series. Instead, he decided to have Percival, a character created specifically for the sequel, as the protagonist. During an interview in April 2021, Suzuki commented that, in regards to Percival's design, he particularly focuses on the cuteness of the character when drawing him, adding elements that are able to highlight this in Percival, such as his helmet and cloak.

Media

Manga
Written and illustrated by Nakaba Suzuki, the manga was announced in November 2020. The series began its serialization in Kodansha's shōnen manga magazine Weekly Shōnen Magazine on January 27, 2021. Kodansha has collected its chapters into individual tankōbon volumes. The first volume was released on April 16, 2021. As of March 16, 2023, eleven volumes have been released.

North American publisher Kodansha USA has licensed the series for simulpublication in North America as it is released in Japan. With the first five chapters of the series already available when it started to be published on February 23, 2021 on multiple digital platforms, including Crunchyroll Manga, BookWalker, ComiXology and Amazon Kindle, with a chapter of the manga translated into English being released weekly. The series is available in English worldwide (except Japan) on the digital manga service Azuki, which was launched on June 28, 2021. Additionally, Kodansha Comics started releasing the volumes in print on January 25, 2022.

Volume list

Chapters not yet in tankōbon format
These chapters have yet to be published in a tankōbon volume.

Anime
In May 2022, it was announced that the manga would receive an anime television series adaptation. It will be produced by Telecom Animation Film and will premiere in 2023.

Reception

Popularity 
In June 2021, Four Knights of the Apocalypse was nominated for the seventh Next Manga Award in the Best Printed Manga category.

Critical response 
Ever since it began its serialization, the series has received a generally positive reception from fans and critics alike. Junko Kuroda said the manga is "definitely an adventure fantasy that can be enjoyed smoothly", even for fans unfamiliar with The Seven Deadly Sins.

Notes

References

External links 
 

Adventure anime and manga
Fantasy anime and manga
Four Horsemen of the Apocalypse in popular culture
Kodansha manga
The Seven Deadly Sins
Shōnen manga
TMS Entertainment
Upcoming anime television series